Kempsey may refer to the following places:

 Kempsey, New South Wales, Australia
 Kempsey, Worcestershire, England